Roman Štrba was born on March 8,1974 in Liptovský Mikuláš.￼￼ He is a Slovak slalom canoeist who competed at the international level from 1990 to 2000.

Štrba won two medals in the C2 team event at the ICF Canoe Slalom World Championships with a silver in 1999 and a bronze in 1993. He won the overall World Cup title in the C2 class in 1998, he also won 2 medals at the European Championships (1 silver and 1 bronze).

Štrba finished 13th in the C2 event at the 1996 Summer Olympics in Atlanta.

His partner in the C2 boat throughout the whole of his active career was Roman Vajs.

World Cup individual podiums

Paralysis
On March 29, 2001, a defunct 36-meter tall chimney in Liptovský Mikuláš collapsed under Štrba. He survived the fall, but it left him completely paralyzed.

References

1974 births
Canoeists at the 1996 Summer Olympics
Living people
Olympic canoeists of Slovakia
Slovak male canoeists
Sportspeople from Liptovský Mikuláš
Medalists at the ICF Canoe Slalom World Championships